Petrivka (until 2016 Petrivske (Петрівське)) is a village in Volnovakha Raion (district) in Donetsk Oblast of eastern Ukraine, at 71.7 km SSW from the centre of Donetsk city.

The settlement was taken under control of pro-Russian forces during the War in Donbass, that started in 2014.

Demographics
The settlement had 19 inhabitants in 2001; native language distribution as of the Ukrainian Census of 2001:
Ukrainian: 15.79%
Russian: 84.21%

References

Villages in Volnovakha Raion